Anthony Pena (born February 18, 1947) is an American actor best known for his portrayal of Newman family butler, Miguel Rodriquez, on the CBS daytime soap opera, The Young and the Restless. Prior to joining the series in 1984, Pena starred on General Hospital as Harry Greg. His numerous television credits include guest roles on Highway to Heaven, Dynasty and MacGyver. In 1996, Pena won a Nosotros Silver Anniversary Golden Eagle Award for his contributions to Daytime television.

He left The Young and the Restless in 2006 after 22 years, but his character was not written out off-screen until 2008.

He also appeared in the 1982 movie Megaforce, the 1983 film Porky's II: The Next Day as John Henry's Brother, and the 1987 movie The Running Man as Valdez (credited as Anthony Penya).

Filmography

External links
 

1947 births
Male actors from Texas
American male film actors
American male soap opera actors
American male television actors
Hispanic and Latino American male actors
Living people
People from San Antonio